Grêmio Catanduvense de Futebol, commonly known as Grêmio Catanduvense, is a currently inactive Brazilian football club based in Catanduva, São Paulo state.

History
The club was founded on March 8, 1999. They finished as the Campeonato Paulista Segunda Divisão runners-up in 2006.

Stadium
Grêmio Catanduvense de Futebol play their home games at Estádio Municipal Silvo Salles. The stadium has a maximum capacity of 16,474 people.

References

External links
 Official website

Association football clubs established in 1999
Football clubs in São Paulo (state)
1999 establishments in Brazil